Systropus is a genus of bee flies (insects in the family Bombyliidae). There are about 16 described species in Systropus.

Species
S. ammophiloides Townsend, 1901
S. angulatus (Karsch, 1880
S. arizonicus Banks, 1909
S. basilaris Painter, 1963
S. bicornis Painter, 1963
S. dolorosus Williston, 1901
S. lugubris Osten Sacken, 1887
S. macer Loew, 1863
S. macilentus Wiedemann, 1920
S. nigripes Painter, 1963
S. paloides Painter, 1963
S. pulcher Williston, 1901
S. rufiventris Osten Sacken, 1887
S. sallei A. Costa, 1865
S. semialbus Painter, 1963
S. similis Williston, 1901
S. vicinus Painter, 1963

References

Further reading

External links

 

Bombyliidae genera